Howard Lake is a lake in the U.S. state of California. The elevation of the lake is 2992 feet.

References

Lakes of California
Lakes of Mendocino County, California